Through the Fire is a 1982 Soviet war film directed by Leonid Makarychev.

Plot 
The film tells about the boy Pavlik, who, together with his mother, ended up in the territory occupied by the Nazis. Mother was arrested. Pavlik was an orphan and went on foot to Leningrad.

Cast 
 Boris Krichevsky as Pavlik (as Borya Krichevsky)
 Aleksey Buldakov as Savely
 Tatyana Bedova
 Aleksandr Susnin as Grigory Timofeev
 Georgiy Shtil
 Valentin Bukin
 Era Ziganshina	
 Natalya Dmitriyeva
 Mikhail Semyonov	
 Svetlana Kireeva

References

External links 
 

1982 films
1980s Russian-language films
Soviet war films
Soviet World War II films
Russian World War II films